Powayan or Pawayan is a town and a subdivisional headquarters in Shahjahanpur district in the Indian state of Uttar Pradesh, 27 km from Shahjahanpur, 47km from Tilhar. It is located in the fertile agricultural belt of Northern India and is 300 km from Delhi and 200 km from Lucknow.

History
Sometime after 1250 AD, one branch of Gaur Rajputs established kingdoms at Chandra, Maholi and Katesar in Sitapur in present Uttar Pradesh. A daughter of Chandra House of Gaurs was married to Rao Gopal Singh, the Katehria chieftain of Nahil. Rao Gopal Singh was killed in a battle by Rohilla Pathans and his widow sought the aid of her Gaur kinsmen on behalf her two infant sons. Thereupon Bhupat Singh and Himmat Singh of Chandra led a force into the district to re-establish the Katehrias at Nahil. Repeated attacks and disputes with the pathans compelled Bhupat Singh to send his son, Raja Udai Singh to Nahil's aid. Raja Udai Singh defeated the pathans at Deokali and established his estate at Powayan. He established a Fortress at Powayan around 1705 AD and there after his descendants established Powayan as the largest Rajput Estate in Rohilkhand area. Legend goes that Powayan was established originally from east of Nahil or formed the Poorvaiyan chowk. Poorvaiyan over passage of time got distorted to Powayan or Powayan. With time the estate of Nahil lost luster and Puwayan flourished under the Gaur rulers. The title of ‘Raja’ is hereditary and was recognized by the colonial British in subsequent years. The estate of the Tilakdhari Rajas of Powayan had 537 villages in Parganas of Powayan, Baragaon and Khutar.

The Powayan Tahsil is bounded on the south-west by Tilhar and Shajahanpur, south and east by Kheri district, north and west by Puranpur & Bisalpur tahsils of Pilibhit district. The total area of Puwayan Tehsil is 378,418 acres or 591 sq. miles. The language spoken is primarily Hindi with a dialect that is a mixture of Kanaujia and Braj. As per the census of 1901 there were a total of 5408 inhabitants, of whom 3776 were Hindus, 1384 Muslims and 248, other religions. A large fair was held every year on Dusshera and a smaller gathering known as Chhariyan takes place in the month of Chait.

Demographics
 India census, Powayan had a population of 28,613. Males constitute 54% of the population and females 46%. Powayan has an average literacy rate of 65%, : male literacy is 65%, and female literacy is 52%. In Powayan, 15% of the population is under 6 years of age.

Powayan has an agriculturally based economy, as is the case with most of the towns in Uttar Pradesh. Powayan is also known in local areas for production and maintenance of agricultural equipment, with many families involved in such businesses. Powayan is also known as "Mini Punjab " of UP as 40% of the population of this area are Sikhs.

Notable people 

 Hira Thind (Punjabi singer)

See also
 Khutar
 Jewan

References 

Cities and towns in Shahjahanpur district